The Cecil M. Buffalo Jr. House is a historic house at 16324 Arch Street Pike in Landmark, Arkansas.  It is a single-story semi-circular structure, finished mainly in glass and fieldstone, with some vertical board siding.  The outside portion of the semi-circle is mainly finished with sliding glass doors, while the inside portion has more windows.  The building is topped by a flat roof.  The house was built in 1968 to a design by Oklahoma architect Dean Bryant Vollendorf, and is a good example of his "Baysweep" style.

The house was listed on the National Register of Historic Places in 2018.

See also
National Register of Historic Places listings in Pulaski County, Arkansas

References

Houses on the National Register of Historic Places in Arkansas
Houses completed in 1968
National Register of Historic Places in Pulaski County, Arkansas